The Baltimore Orioles' 2012 season was the 112th season in franchise history, the 59th in Baltimore, and the 21st at Oriole Park at Camden Yards. They completed the regular season with a 93–69 record, good for second place in the AL East and qualified for one of two American League wild card spots. It was the first time since 1997 that they finished with a winning record and made the playoffs. They subsequently defeated the Texas Rangers in the inaugural one-game Wild Card Playoff. They advanced to play the New York Yankees in the Division Series, but lost the series to the Yankees in five games.

Offseason

December
On December 1, 2011, the Orioles traded minor league RHP Randy Henry and a player to be named later to the Texas Rangers for C Taylor Teagarden. On December 8, 2011, the player was identified as minor league 2B Greg Miclat.
On December 8, 2011, the Orioles traded minor league LHP Jarret Martin and OF Tyler Henson to the Los Angeles Dodgers for LHP Dana Eveland.
On December 13, 2011, the Orioles signed Tsuyoshi Wada to a two-year contract, with an option for a third year.
On December 20, 2011, the Orioles signed outfielder Endy Chávez to a one-year contract.

January
On January 3, 2012, the Orioles acquired Jai Miller from the Oakland Athletics for cash considerations.
On January 10, 2012, the Orioles signed Wei-Yin Chen from the Chunichi Dragons to a three-year contract, with an option for a fourth year.
On January 23, 2012, the Orioles signed infielder Wilson Betemit to a two-year contract, with an option for a third year.

February
On February 6, 2012, Jeremy Guthrie was traded to the Colorado Rockies for pitchers Matt Lindstrom and Jason Hammel.
On February 10, 2012, the Orioles signed RHP Luis Ayala to a one-year contract, with an option for a second year.

March
On March 2, 2012, the Orioles signed Miguel González to a minor league contract.

Regular season
On May 6, the Orioles won a marathon 17-inning game over the Boston Red Sox with the pitching win credited to designated hitter Chris Davis. After the Orioles bullpen was exhausted Davis came on to pitch two scoreless innings with two strikeouts, becoming the first American League position player to record a pitching win since 1968. Boston DH Darnell McDonald took the loss, making it the first game since 1902 in which both pitchers of record were position players.

The Orioles clinched their first non-losing season since 1997 on September 13, 2012, winning their 81st game on a walk-off single by Manny Machado in the bottom of the 14th inning against the Tampa Bay Rays.

On September 26, 2012, the Orioles hit 7 home runs versus the Toronto Blue Jays. Nate McLouth solo in the 1st inning, Jim Thome lead off in the 5th, Manny Machado solo homer in the 5th and a two-run shot in the 8th, Chris Davis three-run homer in the 5th and a two-run homer in the 7th, and Mark Reynolds two-run homer in the 6th.

After falling in extra innings to the New York Yankees on back-to-back nights in early April, the Orioles went 16–0 in extra-inning games through the rest of the season. They also went 29–9 in one-run games, which many analysists point to as the reason the Orioles snapped their long postseason drought, given their modest run differential of +7.

Accolades
The following players represented the Orioles in the 2012 Major League Baseball All-Star Game
Jim Johnson
Adam Jones
Matt Wieters
The following players received Gold Glove Awards for the 2012 MLB season
J. J. Hardy
Adam Jones
Matt Wieters

Postseason

Wild Card Game

The Orioles took on the Texas Rangers in Arlington, Texas in the inaugural Wild Card "winner-take-all" format game for the right to play the New York Yankees in the 2012 American League Division Series, who are the top seed finishing with the best record in the AL at 95–67. The Orioles defeated Texas, 5–1, to win their first postseason game since 1997 and to advance to play the Yankees with the first two games in Baltimore.

In the end, Jim Johnson finished the Rangers off in the 9th despite them giving Baltimore a scare on having the bases loaded and two down. However, Johnson got David Murphy to fly out to Nate McLouth. Unlikely hero Joe Saunders picked up his first ever win at Rangers Stadium, where he was 0–6 with a 9.38 ERA in six career starts.

Division Series

The Orioles next played the New York Yankees in the Division Series, which they lost in five games.

Game 1, October 7
6:07 p.m. (EDT) at Oriole Park at Camden Yards in Baltimore, Maryland (moved to 8:47 p.m. EDT due to rain delay)

Game 2, October 8
8:07 p.m. (EDT) at Oriole Park at Camden Yards in Baltimore, Maryland (moved to 8:47 p.m. EDT due to rain delay)

Game 3, October 10
7:37 p.m. (EDT) at Yankee Stadium in Bronx, New York

Game 4, October 11 
7:37 p.m. (EDT) at Yankee Stadium in Bronx, New York

Game 5, October 12
5:07 p.m. (EDT) at Yankee Stadium in Bronx, New York

Roster

Season standings

American League East

American League Wild Card

Record vs. opponents

Game log

|-  style="text-align:center; background:#cfc;"
| 1 || April 6 || Twins || 4–2 || Arrieta (1–0) || Pavano (0–1) || Johnson (1) || 46,773 || 1–0
|-  style="text-align:center; background:#cfc;"
| 2 || April 7 || Twins || 8–2 || Hunter (1–0) || Liriano (0–1) || || 31,532 || 2–0
|-  style="text-align:center; background:#cfc;"
| 3 || April 8 || Twins || 3–1 || Hammel (1–0) || Swarzak (0–1) || Johnson (2) || 14,738 || 3–0
|-  style="text-align:center; background:#fbb;"
| 4 || April 9 || Yankees || 2–6 || Nova (1–0) || Matusz (0–1) || || 25,478 || 3–1
|-  style="text-align:center; background:#fbb;"
| 5 || April 10 || Yankees || 4–5 (12) || Rapada (1–0) || Strop (0–1) || Rivera (1) || 24,659 || 3–2
|-  style="text-align:center; background:#fbb;"
| 6 || April 11 || Yankees || 4–6 (10) || Soriano (1–0) || Gregg (0–1) || Rivera (2) || 22,919 || 3–3
|-  style="text-align:center; background:#cfc;"
| 7 || April 13 || @ Blue Jays || 7–5 || O'Day (1–0) || Oliver (0–1) || Johnson (3) || 21,988 || 4–3
|-  style="text-align:center; background:#cfc;"
| 8 || April 14 || @ Blue Jays || 6–4 || Ayala (1–0) || Cordero (0–1) || Johnson (4) || 28,355 || 5–3
|-  style="text-align:center; background:#fbb;"
| 9 || April 15 || @ Blue Jays || 2–9 || Drabek (2–0) || Matusz (0–2) || || 20,252 || 5–4
|-  style="text-align:center; background:#cfc;"
| 10 || April 16 || @ White Sox || 10–4 (10) || Strop (1–1) || Stewart (0–1) || || 13,732 || 6–4
|-  style="text-align:center; background:#cfc;"
| 11 || April 17 || @ White Sox || 3–2 || Chen (1–0) || Danks (1–2) || Johnson (5) || 11,267 || 7–4
|-  style="text-align:center; background:#fbb;"
| 12 || April 18 || @ White Sox || 1–8 || Peavy (2–0) || Hunter (1–1) || ||  13,818 || 7–5
|-  style="text-align:center; background:#cfc;"
| 13 || April 19 || @ White Sox || 5–3 || Hammel (2–0) || Floyd (1–2) || Johnson (6) || 11,836 || 8–5
|-  style="text-align:center; background:#fbb;"
| 14 || April 20 || @ Angels || 3–6 || Williams (1–1) || Matusz (0–3) || Walden (1) || 32,272 || 8–6
|-  style="text-align:center; background:#fbb;"
| 15 || April 21 || @ Angels || 3–6 || Weaver (3–0) || Arrieta (1–1) || || 38,054 || 8–7
|-  style="text-align:center; background:#cfc;"
| 16 || April 22 || @ Angels || 3–2 (10) || Strop (2–1) || Hawkins (0–1) || Johnson (7) || 38,221 || 9–7
|-  style="text-align:center; background:#cfc;"
| 17 || April 24 || Blue Jays || 2–1 || Hunter (2–1) || Álvarez (0–2) || Strop (1) || 11,058 || 10–7
|-  style="text-align:center; background:#cfc;"
| 18 || April 25 || Blue Jays || 3–0 || Hammel (3–0) || Drabek (2–1) || Strop (2) || 10,415 || 11–7
|-  style="text-align:center; background:#cfc;"
| 19 || April 26 || Blue Jays || 5–2 || O'Day (2–0) || Janssen (1–1) || Ayala (1) || 13,725 || 12–7
|-  style="text-align:center; background:#fbb;"
| 20 || April 27 || Athletics || 2–5 || McCarthy (1–3) || Arrieta (1–2) || Balfour (6) || 18,297 || 12–8
|-  style="text-align:center; background:#cfc;"
| 21 || April 28 || Athletics || 10–1 || Chen (2–0) || Ross (1–1) || || 26,926 || 13–8
|-  style="text-align:center; background:#cfc;"
| 22 || April 29 || Athletics || 5–2 || Strop (3–1) || Balfour (0–1) || || 31,793 || 14–8
|-  style="text-align:center; background:#fbb;"
| 23 || April 30 || @ Yankees || 1–2 || Kuroda (2–3) || Hammel (3–1) || Rivera (5) || 36,890 || 14–9
|-

|-  style="text-align:center; background:#cfc;"
| 24 || May 1 || @ Yankees || 7–1 || Matusz (1–3) || Hughes (1–4) || || 37,790 || 15–9
|-  style="text-align:center; background:#cfc;"
| 25 || May 2 || @ Yankees || 5–0 || Arrieta (2–2) || Nova (3–1) || || 39,360 || 16–9
|-  style="text-align:center; background:#cfc;"
| 26 || May 4 || @ Red Sox || 6–4 (13) || Patton (1–0) || Morales (0–1) || Johnson (8) || 37,223 || 17–9
|-  style="text-align:center; background:#cfc;"
| 27 || May 5 || @ Red Sox || 8–2 || Hammel (4–1) || Cook (0–1) || || 37,581 || 18–9
|-  style="text-align:center; background:#cfc;"
| 28 || May 6 || @ Red Sox || 9–6 (17) || Davis (1–0) || McDonald (0–1) || || 37,394 || 19–9
|-  style="text-align:center; background:#fbb;"
| 29 || May 7 || Rangers || 3–14 || Harrison (4–2) || Matusz (1–4) || || 11,938 || 19–10
|-  style="text-align:center; background:#fbb;"
| 30 || May 8 || Rangers || 3–10 || Feliz (2–1) || Arrieta (2–3) || || 11,263 || 19–11
|-  style="text-align:center; background:#bbb;" 
|  || May 9 || Rangers || colspan=6| Postponed (rain); Makeup: May 10 as part of a doubleheader
|-  style="text-align:center; background:#cfc;"
| 31 || May 10 || Rangers || 6–5 || Chen (3–0) || Lewis (3–2) || Johnson (9) || || 20–11
|-  style="text-align:center; background:#fbb;"
| 32 || May 10 || Rangers || 3–7 || Holland (3–2) || Hunter (2–2) || || 19,250 || 20–12
|-  style="text-align:center; background:#cfc;"
| 33 || May 11 || Rays || 4–3 || O'Day (3–0) || Peralta (0–2) || Johnson (10) || 26,669 || 21–12
|-  style="text-align:center; background:#cfc;"
| 34 || May 12 || Rays || 5–3 || Matusz (2–4) || Moore (1–3) || Johnson (11) || 32,862 || 22–12
|-  style="text-align:center; background:#fbb;"
| 35 || May 13 || Rays || 8–9 || Shields (6–1) || Arrieta (2–4) || Rodney (10) || 29,552 || 22–13
|-  style="text-align:center; background:#fbb;"
| 36 || May 14 || Yankees || 5–8 || Phelps (1–1) || Ayala (1–1) || Soriano (2) || 16,492 || 22–14
|-  style="text-align:center; background:#cfc;"
| 37 || May 15 || Yankees || 5–2 || Chen (4–0) || Sabathia (5–1) ||  Johnson (12) || 24,055 || 23–14
|-  style="text-align:center; background:#cfc;"
| 38 || May 16 || @ Royals || 4–3 (15) || Gregg (1–1) || Adcock (0–1) || Johnson (13) || 17,949 || 24–14
|-  style="text-align:center; background:#cfc;"
| 39 || May 17 || @ Royals || 5–3 || Matusz (3–4) || Hochevar (3–4) || Johnson (14) || 31,076 || 25–14
|-  style="text-align:center; background:#cfc;"
| 40 || May 18 || @ Nationals || 2–1 (11) || Gregg (2–1) || Mattheus (2–1) || Strop (3) || 36,680 || 26–14
|-  style="text-align:center; background:#cfc;"
| 41 || May 19 || @ Nationals || 6–5 || Hammel (5–1) || Detwiler (3–3) || Johnson (15) || 42,331 || 27–14
|-  style="text-align:center; background:#fbb;"
| 42 || May 20 || @ Nationals || 3–9 || Strasburg (4–1) || Chen (4–1) || || 41,918 || 27–15
|-  style="text-align:center; background:#fbb;"
| 43 || May 21 || Red Sox || 6–8 || Miller (1–0) || Gregg (2–2) || Aceves (10) || 16,392 || 27–16
|-  style="text-align:center; background:#cfc;"
| 44 || May 22 || Red Sox || 4–1 || Matusz (4–4) || Doubront (4–2) || Johnson (16) || 25,171 || 28–16
|-  style="text-align:center; background:#fbb;"
| 45 || May 23 || Red Sox || 5–6 || Bard (4–5) || Arrieta (2–5) || Aceves (11) || 27,806 || 28–17
|-  style="text-align:center; background:#cfc;"
| 46 || May 25 || Royals || 8–2 || Hammel (6–1) || Chen (3–5) || || 28,954 || 29–17
|-  style="text-align:center; background:#fbb;"
| 47 || May 26 || Royals || 3–4 || Holland (1–2) || Strop (3–2) || Broxton (9) || 26,714 || 29–18
|-  style="text-align:center; background:#fbb;"
| 48 || May 27 || Royals || 2–4 || Collins (2–0) || Matusz (4–5) || Broxton (10) || 33,919 || 29–19
|-  style="text-align:center; background:#fbb;"
| 49 || May 28 || @ Blue Jays || 2–6 || Hutchison (4–2) || Hunter (2–3) || Janssen (4) || 16,575 || 29–20
|-  style="text-align:center; background:#fbb;"
| 50 || May 29 || @ Blue Jays || 6–8 || Romero (6–1) || Arrieta (2–6) || || 17,352 || 29–21
|-  style="text-align:center; background:#fbb;"
| 51 || May 30 || @ Blue Jays || 1–4 || Morrow (6–3) || Hammel (6–2) || Janssen (5) || 17,754 || 29–22
|-

|-  style="text-align:center; background:#fbb;"
| 52 || June 1 || @ Rays || 0–5 || Price (7–3) || Chen (4–2) || Rodney (17) || 17,224 || 29–23
|-  style="text-align:center; background:#cfc;"
| 53 || June 2 || @ Rays || 2–1 || Matusz (5–5) || Hellickson (4–2) || Johnson (17) || 21,693 || 30–23
|-  style="text-align:center; background:#fbb;"
| 54 || June 3 || @ Rays || 4–8 || Moore (2–5) || Arrieta (2–7) || || 21,693 || 30–24
|-  style="text-align:center; background:#cfc;"
| 55 || June 5 || @ Red Sox || 8–6 (10) || Johnson (1–0) || Aceves (0–3) || || 37,181 || 31–24
|-  style="text-align:center; background:#cfc;"
| 56 || June 6 || @ Red Sox || 2–1 || Chen (5–2) || Beckett (4–6) || Johnson (18) || 37,243 || 32–24
|-  style="text-align:center; background:#fbb;"
| 57 || June 7 || @ Red Sox || 0–7 || Buchholz (6–2) || Matusz (5–6) || || 37,307 || 32–25
|-  style="text-align:center; background:#fbb;"
| 58 || June 8 || Phillies || 6–9 || Blanton (5–6) || Arrieta (2–8) || Papelbon (16) || 40,459 || 32–26
|-  style="text-align:center; background:#cfc;"
| 59 || June 9 || Phillies || 6–4 (12) || Ayala (2–1) || Rosenberg (0–1) || || 46,611 || 33–26
|-  style="text-align:center; background:#cfc;"
| 60 || June 10 || Phillies || 5–4 (10) || O'Day (4–0) || Savery (0–1) || || 45,267 || 34–26
|-  style="text-align:center; background:#cfc;"
| 61 || June 12 || Pirates || 8–6 || Chen (6–2) || Lincoln (3–2) || Johnson (19) || 15,618 || 35–26
|-  style="text-align:center; background:#cfc;"
| 62 || June 13 || Pirates || 7–1 || Arrieta (3–8) || Correia (2–6) || || 23,238 || 36–26
|-  style="text-align:center; background:#cfc;"
| 63 || June 14 || Pirates || 12–6 || Hunter (3–3) || Bédard (4–7) || || 29,995 || 37–26
|-  style="text-align:center; background:#fbb;"
| 64 || June 15 || @ Braves || 2–4 || Durbin (3–0) || Matusz (5–7) || Kimbrel (19) || 30,384 || 37–27
|-  style="text-align:center; background:#cfc;"
| 65 || June 16 || @ Braves || 5–0 || Hammel (7–2) || Beachy (5–5) || || 41,131 || 38–27
|-  style="text-align:center; background:#cfc;"
| 66 || June 17 || @ Braves || 2–0 || Chen (7–2) || Delgado (4–7) || Johnson (20) || 29,530 || 39–27
|-  style="text-align:center; background:#fbb;"
| 67 || June 18 || @ Mets || 0–5 || Dickey (11–1) || Arrieta (3–9) || || 29,014 || 39–28
|-  style="text-align:center; background:#fbb;"
| 68 || June 19 || @ Mets || 0–5 || Santana (5–3) || Hunter (3–4) || || 32,587 || 39–29
|-  style="text-align:center; background:#fbb;"
| 69 || June 20 || @ Mets || 3–4 || Gee (5–5) || Matusz (5–8) || Francisco (17) || 29,855 || 39–30
|-  style="text-align:center; background:#cfc;"
| 70 || June 22 || Nationals || 2–1 || Hammel (8–2) || Zimmermann (3–6) || Johnson (21) || 45,891 || 40–30
|-  style="text-align:center; background:#fbb;"
| 71 || June 23 || Nationals || 1–3 || Jackson (4–4) || Chen (7–3) || Clippard (12) || 46,298 || 40–31
|-  style="text-align:center; background:#cfc;"
| 72 || June 24 || Nationals || 2–1 || Strop (4–2) || Burnett (0–1)|| Johnson (22) || 41,794 || 41–31
|-  style="text-align:center; background:#fbb;"
| 73 || June 26 || Angels || 3–7 || Wilson (9–4) || Matusz (5–9) || || 24,296 || 41–32
|-  style="text-align:center; background:#fbb;"
| 74 || June 27 || Angels || 1–13 || Weaver (8–1) || Hammel (8–3) || || 18,055 || 41–33
|-  style="text-align:center; background:#fbb;"
| 75 || June 28 || Indians || 2–7 || McAllister (2–1) || Chen (7–4) || || 17,676 || 41–34
|-  style="text-align:center; background:#cfc;"
| 76 || June 29 || Indians || 9–8 || Lindstrom (1–0) || Smith (5–2) || Johnson (23) || 24,779 || 42–34
|-  style="text-align:center; background:#fbb;"
| 77 || June 30 || Indians || 5–11 || Tomlin (4–5) || Eveland (0–1) || || 35,335 || 42–35
|-

|-  style="text-align:center; background:#fbb;"
| 78 || July 1 || Indians || 2–6 || Masterson (5–7) || Matusz (5–10) || || 16,689 || 42–36
|-  style="text-align:center; background:#fbb;"
| 79 || July 2 || @ Mariners || 3–6 || Delabar (2–1) || Hammel (8–4) || Wilhelmsen (7) || 14,805 || 42–37
|-  style="text-align:center; background:#cfc;"
| 80 || July 3 || @ Mariners || 5–4 || O'Day (5–0) || Furbush (4–2) || Johnson (24) || 16,270 || 43–37
|-  style="text-align:center; background:#cfc;"
| 81 || July 4 || @ Mariners || 4–2 || Tillman (1–0) || Noesí (2–11) || Johnson (25) || 21,982 || 44–37
|-  style="text-align:center; background:#fbb;"
| 82 || July 5 || @ Angels || 7–9 || Hawkins (2–1) || Ayala (2–2) || Frieri (11) || 38,104 || 44–38
|-  style="text-align:center; background:#cfc;"
| 83 || July 6 || @ Angels || 3–2 || González (1–0) || Wilson (9–5) || Johnson (26) || 42,716 || 45–38
|-  style="text-align:center; background:#fbb;"
| 84 || July 7 || @ Angels || 0–3 || Weaver (10–1) || Hammel (8–5) || Downs (8) || 41,147 || 45–39
|-  style="text-align:center; background:#fbb;"
| 85 || July 8 || @ Angels || 0–6 || Mills (1–0) || Chen (7–5) || || 37,108 || 45–40
|-  style="text-align:center; bgcolor="bbcaff"
| ASG || July 10 || All-Star Game || AL 0–8 NL || Cain || Verlander ||  || colspan="2" |Kauffman Stadium, Kansas City, MO 
|-  style="text-align:center; background:#fbb;"
| 86 || July 13 || Tigers || 2–7 || Fister (3–6) || Hammel (8–6) || || 35,566 || 45–41
|-  style="text-align:center; background:#cfc;"
| 87 || July 14 || Tigers || 8–6 (13) || Gregg (3–2) || Benoit (1–2) || || 43,215 || 46–41
|-  style="text-align:center; background:#fbb;"
| 88 || July 15 || Tigers || 0–4 || Verlander (10–5) || González (1–1) || || 30,439 || 46–42
|-  style="text-align:center; background:#fbb;"
| 89 || July 16 || @ Twins || 7–19 || Diamond (8–3) || Tillman (1–1) || || 32,455 || 46–43
|-  style="text-align:center; background:#fbb;"
| 90 || July 17 || @ Twins || 4–6 || Burnett (3–2) || Ayala (2–3) || Burton (3) || 32,202 || 46–44
|-  style="text-align:center; background:#cfc;"
| 91 || July 18 || @ Twins || 2–1 || Hunter (4–4) || Liriano (3–9) || Johnson (27) || 33,195 || 47–44
|-  style="text-align:center; background:#cfc;"
| 92 || July 19 || @ Twins || 4–3 || Chen (8–5) || Burnett (3–3) || Johnson (28) || 37,676 || 48–44
|-  style="text-align:center; background:#cfc;"
| 93 || July 20 || @ Indians || 10–2 || González (2–1) || Lowe (8–8) || || 33,954 || 49–44
|-  style="text-align:center; background:#cfc;"
| 94 || July 21 || @ Indians || 3–1 || Tillman (2–1) || McAllister (4–2) || Johnson (29) || 36,247 || 50–44
|-  style="text-align:center; background:#cfc;"
| 95 || July 22 || @ Indians || 4–3 || Britton (1–0) || Tomlin (5–7) || Johnson (30) || 28,049 || 51–44
|-  style="text-align:center; background:#fbb;"
| 96 || July 23 || @ Indians || 1–3 || Masterson (7–8) || Hunter (4–5) || Perez (27) || 18,264 || 51–45
|-  style="text-align:center; background:#fbb;"
| 97 || July 24 || Rays || 1–3 || Hellickson (5–6) || Chen (8–6) || Rodney (28) || 17,592 || 51–46
|-  style="text-align:center; background:#fbb;"
| 98 || July 25 || Rays || 1–10 || Price (14–4) || González (2–2) || || 19,582 || 51–47
|-  style="text-align:center; background:#cfc;"
| 99 || July 26 || Rays || 6–2 || Tillman (3–1) || Shields (8–7) || || 21,301 || 52–47
|-  style="text-align:center; background:#fbb;"
| 100 || July 27 || Athletics || 9–14 || Blevins (4–0) || Johnson (1–1) || || 29,278 || 52–48
|-  style="text-align:center; background:#fbb;"
| 101 || July 28 || Athletics || 1–6 || Colón (7–8) || Hunter (4–6) || || 21,143 || 52–49
|-  style="text-align:center; background:#cfc;"
| 102 || July 29 || Athletics || 6–1 || Chen (9–6) || Blackley (3–3) || || 19,698 || 53–49
|-  style="text-align:center; background:#cfc;"
| 103 || July 30 || @ Yankees || 5–4 || González (3–2) || García (4–5) || Johnson (31) || 43,052 || 54–49
|-  style="text-align:center; background:#cfc;"
| 104 || July 31 || @ Yankees || 11–5 || Tillman (4–1) || Nova (10–5) || || 42,821 || 55–49
|-

|-  style="text-align:center; background:#fbb;"
| 105 || August 1 || @ Yankees || 3–12 || Hughes (11–8) || Britton (1–1) || || 44,593 || 55–50
|-  style="text-align:center; background:#fbb;"
| 106 || August 3 || @ Rays || 0–2 || Moore (8–7) || Hunter (4–7) || Rodney (32) || 18,410 || 55–51
|-  style="text-align:center; background:#cfc;"
| 107 || August 4 || @ Rays || 4–0 || Chen (10–6) || Hellickson (6–7) || || 20,612 || 56–51
|-  style="text-align:center; background:#cfc;"
| 108 || August 5 || @ Rays || 1–0 (10) || Ayala (3–3) || Peralta (1–4) || Johnson (32) || 29,530 || 57–51
|-  style="text-align:center; background:#cfc;"
| 109 || August 6 || Mariners || 3–1 || Tillman (5–1) || Vargas (12–8) || Johnson (33) || 21,184 || 58–51
|-  style="text-align:center; background:#cfc;"
| 110 || August 7 || Mariners || 8–7 (14) || O'Day (6–0) || Kelley (2–3) || || 15,433 || 59–51
|-  style="text-align:center; background:#cfc;"
| 111 || August 8 || Mariners || 9–2 || Johnson (1–0) || Millwood (4–10) || || 17,312 || 60–51
|-  style="text-align:center; background:#fbb;"
| 112 || August 9 || Royals || 2–8 || Smith (3–4) || Chen (10–7) || || 21,226 || 60–52
|-  style="text-align:center; background:#cfc;"
| 113 || August 10 || Royals || 7–1 || González (4–2) || Hochevar (7–10) || || 17,277 || 61–52
|-  style="text-align:center; background:#fbb;"
| 114 || August 11 || Royals || 3–7 || Mendoza (6–8) || Tillman (5–2) || || 40,456 || 61–53
|-  style="text-align:center; background:#cfc;"
| 115 || August 12 || Royals || 5–3 || Ayala (4–3) || Chen (8–10) || Johnson (34) || 20,935 || 62–53
|-  style="text-align:center; background:#cfc;"
| 116 || August 14 || Red Sox || 7–1 || Chen (11–7) || Beckett (5–10) || || 26,204 || 63–53
|-  style="text-align:center; background:#cfc;"
| 117 || August 15 || Red Sox || 5–3 || González (5–2) || Cook (3–6) || Johnson (35) || 22,269 || 64–53
|-  style="text-align:center; background:#fbb;"
| 118 || August 16 || Red Sox || 3–6 || Buchholz (11–3) || Ayala (4–4) || Aceves (24) || 25,483 || 64–54
|-  style="text-align:center; background:#fbb;"
| 119 || August 17 || @ Tigers || 3–5 || Benoit (2–3) || O'Day (6–1) || Valverde (23) || 41,620 || 64–55
|-  style="text-align:center; background:#cfc;"
| 120 || August 18 || @ Tigers || 3–2 || Britton (2–1) || Porcello (9–8) || Johnson (36) || 42,132 || 65–55
|-  style="text-align:center; background:#cfc;"
| 121 || August 19 || @ Tigers || 7–5 || Chen (12–7) || Fister (7–8) || Johnson (37) || 40,511 || 66–55
|-  style="text-align:center; background:#fbb;"
| 122 || August 20 || @ Rangers || 1–5 || Dempster (7–6) || González (5–3) || || 36,257 || 66–56
|-  style="text-align:center; background:#cfc;"
| 123 || August 21 || @ Rangers || 5–3 || Tillman (6–2) || Feldman (6–9) || Johnson (38) || 32,146 || 67–56
|-  style="text-align:center; background:#fbb;"
| 124 || August 22 || @ Rangers || 3–12 || Holland (8–6) || Hunter (4–8) || || 40,714 || 67–57
|-  style="text-align:center; background:#cfc;"
| 125 || August 24 || Blue Jays || 6–4 || Britton (3–1) || Villanueva (6–4) || Johnson (39) || 25,754 || 68–57
|-  style="text-align:center; background:#cfc;"
| 126 || August 25 || Blue Jays || 8–2 || Johnson (2–0) || Morrow (7–5) || || 25,082 || 69–57
|-  style="text-align:center; background:#bbb;"
| || August 26 || Blue Jays || colspan=6| Postponed (rain); Makeup: September 24 as part of a doubleheader
|-  style="text-align:center; background:#cfc;"
| 127 || August 27 || White Sox || 4–3 || Strop (5–2) || Myers (2–6) || Johnson (40) || 10,955 || 70–57
|-  style="text-align:center; background:#cfc;"
| 128 || August 28 || White Sox || 6–0 || Tillman (7–2) || Sale (15–5) || || 12,841 || 71–57
|-  style="text-align:center; background:#fbb;"
| 129 || August 29 || White Sox || 1–8 || Axelrod (2–2) || Saunders (6–11) || || 13,098 || 71–58
|-  style="text-align:center; background:#cfc;"
| 130 || August 30 || White Sox || 5–3 || Britton (4–1) || Quintana (5–3) || Johnson (41) || 10,141 || 72–58
|-  style="text-align:center; background:#cfc;"
| 131 || August 31 || @ Yankees || 6–1 || González (6–3) || Kuroda (12–10) || || 43,352 || 73–58
|-

|-  style="text-align:center; background:#fbb;"
| 132 || September 1 || @ Yankees || 3–4 || Logan (6–2) || Chen (12–8) || Soriano (35) || 46,122 || 73–59
|-  style="text-align:center; background:#cfc;"
| 133 || September 2 || @ Yankees || 8–3 || Wolf (4–10) || Hughes (13–12) || || 46,501 || 74–59
|-  style="text-align:center; background:#cfc;"
| 134 || September 3 || @ Blue Jays || 4–0 || Saunders (7–11) || Happ (10–11) || || 17,220 || 75–59
|-  style="text-align:center; background:#cfc;"
| 135 || September 4 || @ Blue Jays || 12–0 || Britton (5–1) || Villanueva (7–5) || || 13,556 || 76–59
|-  style="text-align:center; background:#fbb;"
| 136 || September 5 || @ Blue Jays || 4–6 || Delabar (4–1) || González (6–4) || || 14,458 || 76–60
|-  style="text-align:center; background:#cfc;"
| 137 || September 6 || Yankees || 10–6 || O'Day (7–1) || Robertson (1–6) || || 46,298 || 77–60
|-  style="text-align:center; background:#fbb;"
| 138 || September 7 || Yankees || 5–8 || Hughes (14–12) || Chen (12–9) || || 40,861 || 77–61
|-  style="text-align:center; background:#cfc;"
| 139 || September 8 || Yankees || 5–4 || Saunders (8–11) || Sabathia (13–5) || Johnson (42) || 46,067 || 78–61 
|-  style="text-align:center; background:#fbb;"
| 140 || September 9 || Yankees || 3–13 || Chamberlain (1–0) || Britton (5–2) || || 40,346 || 78–62
|-  style="text-align:center; background:#cfc;"
| 141 || September 11 || Rays || 9–2 || Johnson (3–0) || Moore (10–10) || || 23,828 || 79–62
|-  style="text-align:center; background:#cfc;"
| 142 || September 12 || Rays || 3–2 || Johnson (2–1) || Farnsworth (1–5) || || 26,076 || 80–62
|-  style="text-align:center; background:#cfc;"
| 143 || September 13 || Rays || 3–2 (14) || Wolf (5–10) || Archer (0–3) || || 25,130 || 81–62
|-  style="text-align:center; background:#fbb;"
| 144 || September 14 || @ Athletics || 2–3 || Milone (13–10) || Saunders (8–12) || Balfour (18) || 35,067 || 81–63
|-  style="text-align:center; background:#fbb;"
| 145 || September 15 || @ Athletics || 2–5 || Parker (11–8) || Britton (5–3) || Balfour (19) || 20,342 || 81–64
|-  style="text-align:center; background:#cfc;"
| 146 || September 16 || @ Athletics || 9–5 || Matusz (6–10) || Straily (2–1) || Johnson (43) || 20,539 || 82–64
|-  style="text-align:center; background:#cfc;"
| 147 || September 17 || @ Mariners || 10–4 || Tillman (8–2) || Noesí (2–12) || || 13,036 || 83–64
|-  style="text-align:center; background:#cfc;"
| 148 || September 18 || @ Mariners || 4–2 (18) || Hunter (5–8) || Luetge (2–2) || Johnson (44) || 12,608 || 84–64
|-  style="text-align:center; background:#cfc;"
| 149 || September 19 || @ Mariners || 3–1 (11) || Ayala (5–4) || Kinney (0–3) || Johnson (45) || 14,001 || 85–64
|-  style="text-align:center; background:#cfc;"
| 150 || September 21 || @ Red Sox || 4–2 || González(7–4) || Lester (9–13) || Johnson (46) ||37,731 || 86–64
|-  style="text-align:center; background:#cfc;"
| 151 || September 22 || @ Red Sox || 9–6 (12) || Hunter (6–8) || Aceves (2–10) || Johnson (47) || 37,570 || 87–64
|-  style="text-align:center; background:#fbb;"
| 152 || September 23 || @ Red Sox || 1–2 || Tazawa (1–1) || Ayala (5–5) || Bailey (6) || 37,310 || 87–65
|-  style="text-align:center; background:#cfc;"
| 153 || September 24 || Blue Jays || 4–1 || Johnson (4–0) || Álvarez (9–14) || Johnson (48) || || 88–65
|-  style="text-align:center; background:#fbb;"
| 154 || September 24 || Blue Jays || 5–9 || Romero (9–14) || Chen (12–10) || || 31,015 || 88–66
|-  style="text-align:center; background:#fbb;"
| 155 || September 25 || Blue Jays || 0–4 || Laffey (4–6) || Saunders (8–13) || || 30,205 || 88–67 
|-  style="text-align:center; background:#cfc;"
| 156 || September 26 || Blue Jays || 12–2 || González (8–4) || Villanueva (7–7) || || 26,513 || 89–67
|-  style="text-align:center; background:#cfc;"
| 157 || September 28 || Red Sox || 9–1 || Tillman (9–2) || Cook (4–11) || || 33,518 || 90–67
|-  style="text-align:center; background:#cfc;"
| 158 || September 29 || Red Sox || 4–3 || Hunter (7–8) || Doubront (11–10) || Johnson (49) || 46,311 || 91–67
|-  style="text-align:center; background:#cfc;"
| 159 || September 30 || Red Sox || 6–3 || Saunders (9–13) || Stewart (1–4) || Johnson (50) || 41,257 || 92–67
|-  style="text-align:center; background:#fbb;"
| 160 || October 1 || @ Rays || 3–5 || Cobb (11–9) || Chen (12–11) || Rodney (47) || 13,666 || 92–68
|-  style="text-align:center; background:#cfc;"
| 161 || October 2 || @ Rays || 1–0 || González (9–4) || Shields (15–10) || Johnson (51) || 13,460 || 93–68
|-  style="text-align:center; background:#fbb;"
| 162 || October 3 || @ Rays || 1–4 || Hellickson (10–11) || Tillman (9–3) || Rodney (48) || 17,909 || 93–69
|-

Player stats

Batting
Note: G = Games played; AB = At bats; R = Runs scored; H = Hits; 2B = Doubles; 3B = Triples; HR = Home runs; RBI = Runs batted in; AVG = Batting average; SB = Stolen bases

Pitching
Note: W = Wins; L = Losses; ERA = Earned run average; G = Games pitched; GS = Games started; SV = Saves; IP = Innings pitched; H = Hits allowed; R = Runs allowed; ER = Earned runs allowed; BB = Walks allowed; K = Strikeouts

Farm system

References

External links
2012 Baltimore Orioles season at Official site
2012 Baltimore Orioles season at Baseball Reference

Baltimore Orioles seasons
Baltimore Orioles
Baltimore